Donna Ferrara (born June 22, 1959) is an American lawyer and politician from New York.

Life
She was born on June 22, 1959. She graduated B.A. in English from SUNY Albany in 1981, and J.D. from St. John's University School of Law in 1984. She married Robert Gregory, and they have two children. They live in Westbury, Nassau County, New York.

She entered politics as a Republican, and was an aide to State Senator Norman J. Levy, and later legislative counsel to Assemblyman Kemp Hannon.

She was a member of the New York State Assembly from 1993 to 2005, sitting in the 190th, 191st, 192nd, 193rd, 194th, 195th and 196th New York State Legislatures. In April 2005, she was appointed to the New York State Workers Compensation Board. She was Chairwoman of the Board from 2006 to 2007, and remained on the Board until July 2013.

References

1959 births
Living people
People from Westbury, New York
Women state legislators in New York (state)
Republican Party members of the New York State Assembly
St. John's University School of Law alumni
University at Albany, SUNY alumni
21st-century American women